Chevol Grant, better known by his stage name Indecka, is a Jamaican reggae and dancehall singer and songwriter. He is a follower of the Rastafarian Faith.

Early life and career
Indecka was raised by his grandmother in Kingston, Jamaica. Experiencing many hardships in his early life, he turned to music for daily motivation. Learning about music in primary school, Indecka began singing at the age of 5. By age 15, he was writing poetry, and shortly after he began putting melodies to his written words.

In 2002 Indecka met Michael "Jah Mikes" Bell, the head producer at Yahbell Entertainment, and shortly after recorded his first song "Always Be There" for him. Since then, he has recorded for various producers, including Jami Dread from the Austria-based Lyrical Wars Records. In 2008 he started working with Julius "Zege" Mitchell, a producer/engineer for Sweat Boxx Productions out of Greater Portmore in Saint Catherine Parish, Jamaica. While working with Zege, Indecka began performing on various stage shows including the annual Sting music festival in 2009.

Indecka has matured both as an individual and a musician.  With songs like "Rice and Peas"; "Jah Protect Me"; and "The Summer is On Again"; Indecka shows his versatility in doing different genres of music including Reggae and Dancehall. He is ready to take in music to an international level with his commanding voice, positive lyrics, high energy and original style.

"I want people to get familiar with my name and my work. This is something I am doing for the long run and not just a temporary thing," he said.

References

Living people
Jamaican dancehall musicians
Jamaican reggae singers
Jamaican male singers
Musicians from Kingston, Jamaica
Year of birth missing (living people)